Colin Watts (9 January 1921 – 7 November 2013) was an Australian cricketer. He played nine first-class matches for South Australia between 1947 and 1954.

References

External links
 

1921 births
2013 deaths
Australian cricketers
South Australia cricketers
Cricketers from Adelaide